A Funk Odyssey is the fifth studio album by English funk band Jamiroquai. The album was released on 3 September 2001 in the United Kingdom by Sony Soho Square and 11 September 2001 by Epic Records in the United States.

Background
Combining elements of funk, disco and electronica, the release of the album represented the peak of international commercial success for Jamiroquai, and in the ensuing world tour the group became a household name in many countries. The sleeve art of A Funk Odyssey features lead vocalist Jay Kay posed in front of a series of lasers, making it the first Jamiroquai album not to feature the Buffalo Man logo on its cover.

In a 2001 interview with Billboard magazine, Kay said he wrote the deliberately simple first single "Little L" in 25 minutes, "It would have been so easy to overthink and overwrite that song, because it's so incredibly simple. But that would've killed it." He described the fourth single, "Corner of the Earth", as a "spiritual song" that "speaks for anyone who's in a place or a moment where they're happy." For the tenth track, "Picture of My Life", Kay said, "I cried throughout the process of writing [the song]. It was an act of looking at some major personal issues and understanding their lingering effects."

Reception

Initial critical response to A Funk Odyssey was generally mixed to positive. At Metacritic, which assigns a normalised rating out of 100 to reviews from mainstream critics, the album has received an average score of 58, based on 13 reviews. Q magazine gave the album 4 out of 5 stars, claiming "A certified thoroughbred. This time, there's a bankable chorus or barbed sentiment for every mirror-ball moment....demonstrating that no-one does sci-fi boogie quite as well as he does sci-fi boogie." They also listed it as one of the best 50 albums of 2001. CMJ described the album as "The perfect mixtape to snap your fingers to on your way to another universe." A.D. Amorosi of The Indianapolis Star wrote that "'Corner of the Earth', with its swirling strings and sunlit happiness, may be Kay's finest moment, matching organic ambience with pure emotion." Tom Moon said that the album recalls the band's interest in "the swooping strings and thumping beats" from Earth Wind & Fire and later disco music,  but concludes that "Kay never merely appropriates those devices… he goes back to the future, by Juxtaposing old-school guitars against sizzling house beats."

Release 
A Funk Odyssey had its US release on the day of the September 11 attacks. The album was a commercial success, selling more than 3 million copies worldwide.

Although initially released on CD, vinyl, cassette, and MiniDisc, the vinyl version became scarce due to the vinyl revival of the 21st century, vastly inflating prices. Prior to a 2022 vinyl re-release, it was common to find mint-quality vinyl pressings of the album selling for $150 to $300 or more on the secondary market.

Track listing

Outtakes

"Cannabliss" was a track which was performed live during a pre-album tour in 2001. The track was scrapped from the project after Kay claimed that it wasn't even half complete at the time of going to press. The track's introduction was re-used for "Corner of the Earth". 
The album's title track, "A Funk Odyssey", was performed by the group while on tour; however, it was not included on the album. It is unknown whether this track is an outtake from the album, or was intended as a live-only track. 
"Shoot The Moon" was a further outtake from the album, performed live at least twice: once at the Montreux Jazz Festival in 2003, and once at a concert in Turkey. A live version from the aforementioned Montreux concert can be found on the DVD and Blu-ray concert film Jamiroquai – Live at Montreux 2003. One interesting fact about the song is that it was intended to have a horn section. The band did not have a horn section at the time, so the electric guitar had to substituted in place of the horns. There is no indication that a studio version of the song was ever recorded.

The test pressing of the album also featured three interludes. The first features band frontman Kay in an electronically manipulated monologue, asking himself why he would want to "shut down the funk assembly unit." The second interlude is a beatbox track, which was later sampled in the single "Feels Just Like It Should", while the third features Strauss's "The Blue Danube" being faded in slowly at a low volume. 
A case of synchronicity occurs when the test pressing is played to Stanley Kubrick's film adaptation of Arthur C. Clarke's 2001: A Space Odyssey.

Personnel

Jamiroquai
Jay Kay – vocals
Rob Harris – guitar
Derrick McKenzie – drums
Toby Smith – keyboards
Nick Fyffe – bass
Sola Akingbola – percussion

Additional personnel
Beverley Knight – guest vocals on "Love Foolosophy" and "Main Vein"
Dee Lewis – backing vocals
Simon Hale – string arrangements
John Thirkell – horn arrangements
Paul Stoney – programming

Charts

Weekly charts

Year-end charts

Decade-end chart

Certifications and sales

References

2001 albums
Jamiroquai albums